John F. Kennedy High School is a high school, located in the city of Waterbury, Connecticut, United States. U.S. Congresswoman Jahana Hayes was a teacher here, and won National Teacher of the Year in 2016, prior to her successful run for congress in 2018.

Athletics 
Fall Season:
 Boys' Soccer (JV and Varsity)
 Boys' Football (Freshmen, JV, and Varsity)
 Cross Country (JV and Varsity)
 Girls' Swimming and Diving (JV and Varsity)
 Girls' Volleyball

Winter Season:
 Girls' Basketball
 Cheerleading
 Indoor Track 
 Boys' Swimming and Diving

Spring Season:
 Baseball
 Softball
 Outdoor Track
 Tennis

John F. Kennedy High School is part of the Naugatuck Valley League.

References

External links
 
 District website

Schools in Waterbury, Connecticut
Public high schools in Connecticut